Church Whitfield is a village in the civil parish of Whitfield, and just north of Dover, in Kent, England. Village population is included in Whitfield civil parish. Part of the village is called Pineham.

St Peter's Church is a 10th-century Saxon Church largely rebuilt in Norman times, although the church is first mentioned in 762 AD. It was restored and enlarged in 1894 by Ewan Christian.

References

External links

Villages in Kent